WFFM (105.7 FM) is a radio station licensed to Ashburn, Georgia, United States. The station is currently owned by Danny Sterling, through licensee Sterling Southern Land, LLC.

History
The station began broadcasting in 1989. On July 1, 2013, WFFM changed their format from contemporary Christian (branded as "Hook FM") to country, branded as "The Flame". By 2017, the station had adopted a classic rock format.

On July 6, 2022, WFFM ceased operations.

Previous logo

References

External links

FFM
Radio stations established in 1989
1989 establishments in Georgia (U.S. state)